The 2013–14 Eredivisie was the 58th season of Eredivisie since its establishment in 1955. It began on 2 August 2013 with the first match of the season and ended on 18 May 2014 with the returns of the finals of the European competition and relegation playoffs.

Teams 
A total of 18 teams took part in the league: The best fifteen teams from the 2012–13 season, two promotion/relegation playoff winners and the 2012–13 Eerste Divisie champions.

Personnel and kits 

Note: Flags indicate national team as has been defined under FIFA eligibility rules. Players and Managers may hold more than one non-FIFA nationality.

Managerial changes

League table

Results

Season statistics

Top scorers

Assists

European competition 
The teams finishing fifth through eight play-off for a berth in the Second qualifying round of the 2014–15 UEFA Europa League. Groningen won this berth after winning the four-team play-off.

Key: * = Play-off winners, a = Wins because of away goals rule, e = Wins after extra time in second leg, p = Wins after penalty shoot-out.

Semi-final

First leg

Second leg

Final

First leg

Second leg

Eredivisie play-offs 
Ten teams played for two spots in the 2014–15 Eredivisie. Four teams from the 2013–14 Eerste Divisie entered in the first round, another four and the teams ranked 16th and 17th in the 2013–14 Eredivisie entered in the second round. Both winners of the third round, FC Dordrecht and Excelsior, played in the 2014–15 Eredivisie. 

Key: * = Play-off winners, a = Wins because of away goals rule, e = Wins after extra time in second leg, p = Wins after penalty shoot-out.

First round

Match A

Match B

Second round

Match C

Match D

Match E

Match F

Third round

Match G

Match H

References 

2013-14
Neth
1